Volume 4: Songs in the Key of Love & Hate is the fourth studio album by American post-grunge band Puddle of Mudd. It was released on December 8, 2009, on Flawless Records.

Background

In Spring 2009, the band began recording sessions in Vancouver with Famous producer Brian Howes. Recording in a three part, three week session in Canada initially because of extensive touring duties. Afterwards the band relocated to Hollywood, California for three weeks for additional production with producer and engineer Brian Virtue and Come Clean and Life on Display producer John Kurzweg.  Their first time together in six years. Scantlin commented on production work, "Even though we hate messing with success, we felt adding newcomer Brain Virtue to the producer mix would be a welcome change. What we got is 10 tracks of exactly what we were looking for." 

The band announced through their MySpace and follow-up interviews in late summer that the album had finished production and was in mixing. Bassist Doug Ardito confirmed only 10 songs to avoid what he called "filler material" and to have new listeners focus more on non-single songs. 

Around 21 songs were worked on during production, and whittled down to 10 to 12 tracks according to singer Scantlin. Scantlin described the sound as more edgier, punk rock, similar to earlier releases. 

The album was released on December 8, 2009. It debuted at #95 on the Billboard 200. It sold around 100,000 copies in the United States, and the lead single "Spaceship" also sold well over 100,000 copies. Volume 4 was however the band's first album to not produce a Hot 100 hit, and, unlike the previous albums Come Clean, Life on Display and Famous, neither the album sales or any single sales topped 500,000.
The album was mixed at Ocean Way Recording.

Track listing

Due to the departure of some members during 2009-2011, more than the half of the album songs were never performed live. The only songs that are constant parts of current live gigs are Stoned and Spaceship. In the early 2010s, also Keep It Together and Blood On The Table were performed several times. The rest of the songs have to be performed live yet.

Personnel 
Wesley Scantlin –  Lead Vocals, Rhythm Guitar, 
Paul Phillips –  Lead guitar on all tracks except track 6
Doug Ardito –  Bass
Ryan Yerdon –  Drums on tracks 4,5,7,8,9,10 and 14
Josh Freese –  Drums on tracks 1,2,3, and 6
Duane Betts –  Lead guitar on track 6
Brian Howes –  Additional guitar, Keys and Vocals on tracks 1,2 and 3
Misha Rajaratnam –  String arrangement on track 3
Wesley Michener –  Background vocals on track 5
John Kurzweg –  Piano on tracks 12 and 14
Bill Appelerry –  Piano on "Shook up the world"
Stevie Blacke –  String engineering and arrangements on "Shook up the world"

Production 
Brian Howes –  Producer on tracks 1,2 and 3
Jay "JVP" Van Poederooyen –  Engineer on tracks 1,2, and 3
Brian Virtue –  Producer/Engineer on tracks 4,5,7, and 8
John Kurzweg –  Producer/Engineer on tracks 9, 10, 14
Bill Stevenson –  Producer/Engineer on track 6
Jason Livermore –  Producer/Engineer on track 6
Andrew Berlin –  Engineer on track 6
Johnny Schou –  Engineer on track 6
Tal Herzberg –  Engineer on track 6

"Shook Up the World" produced/mixed/engineered by –  Bill Appelerry 
Written by –  Wesley Scantlin, Paul Phillips and Danny Wimmer
Album Mixed by –  Jack Joseph Puig
Album Mastered –  Ted Jensen

References

External links

Record Label website
Official RSS Feed
Puddle of Mudd at MySpace.com

2009 albums
Puddle of Mudd albums
Geffen Records albums